Little Teachers is a 1998 Italian war drama film written and directed by Daniele Luchetti. Based on the novel I piccoli maestri by Luigi Meneghello, it entered the main competition at the 55th Venice International Film Festival.

Plot 
Autumn of 1943: a group of university students from Vicenza opposes the Nazi invasion by joining the partisans at the plateau of the Sette Comuni. Soon, however, the youngsters realize that they are unable to face the horrors of war and receive the support of a worker, a sailor, a sergeant of the alpini and their esteemed professor, Toni Giuriolo.

Cast 

 Stefano Accorsi as Gigi
 Stefania Montorsi as  Simonetta
 Giorgio Pasotti as  Enrico
  Diego Gianesini as  Lelio
 Filippo Sandon as  Bene 
 Marco Paolini as Toni
  Massimo Santelia as  Marietto
  Marco Piras as  Dante
  Stefano Scandaletti as  Rodino
  Manuel Donato as  Nello
  Luigi Mercanzin as  Moretto

References

External links

1998 films
1990s war drama films
Italian war drama films
Films directed by Daniele Luchetti
Films about Italian resistance movement
Italian Campaign of World War II films
Films set in Veneto
1998 drama films
Italian World War II films
1990s Italian-language films
1990s Italian films